The Quasar Tramp is a Czech high-wing, single-place, hang glider that was designed and produced by Quasar of Dolní Bečva. Now out of production, when it was available the aircraft was supplied complete and ready-to-fly.

Design and development
The Tramp was designed as a simple leisure wing available in just one size. It is made from aluminum tubing, with the single-surface wing covered in Dacron sailcloth. Its  span wing is cable braced from a single kingpost.

Specifications (Tramp)

References

Tramp
Hang gliders